Gılgamış is a 1964 Turkish-language opera by Nevit Kodallı. 

Simultaneously with Kodallı, Ahmed Adnan Saygun was also working around 1964 on a Gilgamesh project, which he completed as his Op.65 Gılgameş.

See also
 Gilgamesh in the arts and popular culture
 Gilgamesh (disambiguation)#Operas

References

Turkish-language operas
1964 operas
Operas
Works based on the Epic of Gilgamesh